The former First Church of Christ, Scientist at 205 Albion Avenue in Fairmont, Minnesota, United States, is a historic Christian Science church building.  It was designed in the Colonial Revival style by Chicago architect Charles Draper Faulkner, who was renowned for the churches and other buildings that he designed in the United States and Japan. He designed over 33 Christian Science church buildings and wrote a book called Christian Science Church Edifices, which features this church as well as many others. Built in 1937 to replace the church's previous building at 222 East Blue Earth Avenue, its steepled redbrick front elevation looks west to Wards Park and beyond that to Sisseton Lake. The church is no longer in existence and the building is now the Lakeview Funeral Home.

References

1937 establishments in Minnesota
Buildings and structures in Martin County, Minnesota
Charles Draper Faulkner church buildings
Churches completed in 1937
Colonial Revival architecture in Minnesota
Former Christian Science churches, societies and buildings in Minnesota